Charles Albert was a French boxer. He competed in the men's flyweight event at the 1920 Summer Olympics. At the 1920 Summer Olympics, he defeated Vincenzo Dell'Oro of Italy, before losing to Joseph Charpentier of Belgium.

References

External links

Year of birth missing
Year of death missing
French male boxers
Olympic boxers of France
Boxers at the 1920 Summer Olympics
Place of birth missing
Flyweight boxers